Qalaychi may refer to:
 Qalaychi, West Azerbaijan
 Qalaychi, Zanjan